The 2016 World Nomad Games was held in Cholpon-Ata, Kyrgyzstan from 3–8 September 2016 with 23 sports featured in the games. The program of the second edition included 23 kinds of ethnosport. 40 countries participated in this games.

Sports 
 Equestrian Sports (Horse Sports) (6): Horse Racing (At Chabysh /  / Kunan Chabysh) + Horse Competitions (Kok-boru /Er enish / Cirit)
 Martial Arts Sports (Traditional Wrestling) (7): Mass-wrestling / Kazakh kuresh / Goresh / Gyulesh / Aba kurosh / Kyrgyz kurosh / Alysh
 Traditional Sports (8): Traditional Games (Ordo) + Horse Racing (Chong at chabysh) +  Traditional Archers Bow (Hiking shooting/Horseback shooting / Mass bow range) + Traditional Hunting
 Traditional Intellectual (2): Togyz Korgool / Mangala

Medal table

References

External links
Official website

2016
2016 in Asian sport
2016 in Kyrgyzstani sport
International sports competitions hosted by Kyrgyzstan
Multi-sport events in Kyrgyzstan